Béatrice du Han de Martigny, Marquise de Meuse (1711-1793), known as Madame de Meuse, was the royal mistress of the regent of the Austrian Netherlands, Charles Alexander of Lorraine.

Béatrice du Han de Martigny was the daughter of a courtier in service of Leopold, Duke of Lorraine, and married marquis François de Choiseul-Meuse (1716-1746). She became acquainted with Charles Alexander during his upbringing in the ducal court of Luneville. In 1760, she joined him in the Austrian Netherlands, and their relationship lasted until the death of Charles Alexander in 1780. Her position led the sister of Charles Alexander, Princess Anne Charlotte of Lorraine, who functioned as the first lady of the court, to criticize him.

She is also known as a correspondent of Françoise de Graffigny.

References
 Correspondance de Madame de Graffigny: 23 octobre 1744-10 septembre 1745, lettres 761-896. Voltaire Foundation, Taylor Institution, 2000
 Françoise de Graffigny: Her Life and Works. Voltaire Foundation, 1 jan 2004
 Revue belge de philologie et d'histoire: Belgisch tijdschrift voor philologie en geschiedenis, Volym 33. Fondation universitaire, 1955.

1711 births
1793 deaths
Mistresses of Austrian royalty
Nobility of the Austrian Netherlands
Women of the Austrian Netherlands